A pocket is a bag- or envelope-like receptacle either fastened to or inserted in an article of clothing to hold small items. Pockets are also  attached to luggage, backpacks, and similar items. In older usage, a pocket was a separate small bag or pouch.

Origins

Ancient people used leather or cloth pouches to hold valuables. Ötzi (also called the "Iceman"), who lived around 3,300 BCE, had a belt with a pouch sewn to it that contained a cache of useful items: a scraper, drill, flint flake, bone awl, and a dried tinder fungus.

In European clothing, fitchets, resembling modern day pockets, appeared in the 13th century. Vertical slits were cut in the super tunic, which did not have any side openings, to allow access to purse or keys slung from the girdle of the tunic. According to historian Rebecca Unsworth, it was in the late 15th century that pockets became more noticeable. During the 16th century, pockets increased in popularity and prevalence.

In slightly later European clothing, pockets began by being hung like purses from a belt, which could be concealed beneath a coat or jerkin to discourage pickpocketing and reached through a slit in the outer garment.

In the 17th century, pockets began to be sewn into men's clothing, but not women's, which continued to be tied on and hidden under the large skirts popular at the time.  
 
The word appears in Middle English as pocket, and is taken from a Norman diminutive of Old French poke, pouque, modern poche, cf. pouch. The form "poke" is now only used in dialect, or in such proverbial sayings as "a pig in a poke".

Historically, the term "pocket" referred to a pouch worn around the waist by women in the 17th to 19th centuries, mentioned in the rhyme Lucy Locket. In these pockets, women would carry items needed in their daily lives, such as scissors, pins and needles, and keys.

In more modern clothing, while men's clothes generally have pockets, women's often don't - and sometimes have what are called Potemkin pockets, a fake slit sewn shut.  If there are pockets they are often much smaller than in men's clothes.  Journalists at the Pudding found less than half of women’s front pockets could fit a thin wallet, let alone a phone and keys.

Types
A watch pocket or fob pocket is a small pocket designed to hold a pocket watch, sometimes found in men's trousers and waistcoats and in traditional blue jeans. However, due to the decline in popularity of pocket watches, these pockets are rarely used for their original intended purpose.

A besom pocket or slit pocket is a pocket cut into a garment instead of being sewn on. These pockets often have reinforced piping along the slit of the pocket, appearing perhaps as an extra piece of fabric or stitching. Besom pockets are found on a tuxedo jacket or trousers and may be accented with a flap or button closure.

Camp pockets or cargo pockets are pockets which have been sewn to the outside of the garment. They are usually squared off and are characterized by seaming.

A beer pocket is a small pocket within a jacket or vest sized specifically for transporting a bottle of beer. It came into fashion in the 1910s in select areas of the American midwest, prior to Prohibition, after which it faded into relative obscurity before experiencing minor revivals in the 1980s and early 2000s.

Examples of pocket designs
In some of the following illustrations, a folded blue handkerchief is included for illustration purposes:

See also
 Handbag
 Pocket square
Reticule 
 Wallet

References

Further reading
 
 
 Different Types of Pocket

External links

 BBC - h2g2 - A Very Brief History of the Pocket
18th Century Women's Pockets
Pockets at the V&A
A History of Pockets, Victoria and Albert Museum
Pockets of History

Parts of clothing